Sayeed Shahidi (born February 14, 2003) is an American actor and model.

Early life
Shahidi was born in St. Paul, Minnesota and is of Iranian, African-American and Choctaw heritage. His mother Keri Salter Shahidi is African-American, whereas his father Afshin Shahidi is Iranian. He lived in St. Paul, Minnesota until age two, then moved to Glendale, California. Sayeed is an Iranian name meaning "Blessing" or "Blessed"; Shahidi is also a common surname in Iran, of Muslim origin. He is the middle child in the family and is the younger brother of actress Yara Shahidi. He also has a younger brother, Ehsan.

Career
Shahidi starred as the character Miles Russell in the 2016 television series Uncle Buck. He also had a recurring role as the character Will in ABC's television series, Switched at Birth. Shahidi was in a few projects with his sister Yara Shahidi, including the crime thriller movie Alex Cross as Damon Cross, the television series The First Family, and the comedy television series Black-ish as Adonis Culpepper (season 2, episode 17).

Personal life
In February 2017, Shahidi was in a relationship with actress Storm Reid.

Filmography

References

External links 
 

2003 births
American male child actors
American male television actors
Living people
Place of birth missing (living people)
African-American male models
African-American models
American male models
African-American male actors
American people of Iranian descent
Male models from Minnesota
American people of Choctaw descent
African-American male child actors
American people of Iranian-African descent
21st-century African-American people